Cunnane is a surname. Notable people with the surname include:

Joe Cunnane (born 1971), Irish Gaelic footballer and Australian rules footballer
Joseph Cunnane (1913–2001), Irish Roman Catholic archbishop
Will Cunnane (born 1974), American baseball player